The following is a list of Duke Blue Devils men's basketball head coaches. The Blue Devils have had 21 coaches in their 110-season history. The team is currently coached by Jon Scheyer.

*Denotes interim head coach

References

Duke

Duke Blue Devils basketball, men's, coaches